The Last Picture Show is a 1971 American coming-of-age drama film directed and co-written by Peter Bogdanovich, adapted from the semi-autobiographical 1966 novel The Last Picture Show by Larry McMurtry. The film's ensemble cast includes Timothy Bottoms, Jeff Bridges, Ellen Burstyn, Ben Johnson, Cloris Leachman, and Cybill Shepherd. Set in a small town in northern Texas from November 1951 to October 1952, it is a story of two high-school seniors and long-time friends, Sonny Crawford (Bottoms) and Duane Jackson (Bridges).

The Last Picture Show was theatrically released on October 22, 1971, by Columbia Pictures. It was a critical and commercial success, grossing $29 million on a $1.3 million budget, and was nominated for eight Academy Awards, including Best Picture, Best Director, Best Supporting Actor for Johnson and Bridges, and Best Supporting Actress for Burstyn and Leachman, with Johnson and Leachman winning.

In 1998, the Library of Congress selected the film for preservation in the United States National Film Registry for being "culturally, historically or aesthetically significant."

Plot
In 1951, Sonny Crawford and Duane Jackson are high-school seniors and friends in tiny Anarene, a declining oil town in northern Texas. Duane is dating Jacy Farrow, the richest and prettiest girl in town. Sonny breaks up with his girlfriend Charlene Duggs.

At Christmas time, Sonny begins an affair with Ruth Popper, the depressed middle-aged wife of his high-school coach. At a Christmas dance, Jacy is invited by Lester Marlow to a skinny dipping party at the home of Bobby Sheen, a wealthy young man who seems to be a better prospect than Duane.

A group of boys including Duane and Sonny take their young, mentally disabled friend, Billy, to a prostitute to lose his virginity, but she hits Billy in the face when he ejaculates prematurely. When the group takes Billy back home, local businessman Sam tells them that since they cannot even take care of a friend, he is barring them from the pool hall, movie theater, and café he owns, all centerpieces of the town's social life. Duane, however, hides in the truck and escapes Sam's reproach. At the café, Genevieve, the waitress, tells Sonny she knows that Duane was with the group but agrees not to tell Sam.

During the weekend of New Year's Eve Duane and Sonny go on a road trip to Mexico. Before they drive off, Sam, who has forgiven Sonny, wistfully wishes he still had the stamina to join them, and gives them some extra money. They return from the trip hung over and tired, to learn that Sam died suddenly of a stroke on New Year's Eve. In his will he left the movie theater to the woman who ran the concession stand; the café to Genevieve; $1,000 to the preacher's son, Joe Bob Blanton; and the pool hall to Sonny.

Because Bobby has told Jacy that he does not date virgins, she invites Duane to a motel for sex, but Duane is unable to get an erection. She loses her virginity to Duane on their second attempt and then breaks up with him by telephone. When Bobby marries another girl, Jacy is disappointed. Out of boredom she has sex on a pool table with Abilene, a roughneck foreman who works for her father and who is also her mother's lover. He is brutally cold to her afterward. Jacy then sets her sights on Sonny, who drops Ruth without a word. Duane quarrels with Sonny over Jacy, "his" girl, smashing a bottle into Sonny's left eye that leaves him badly injured and disqualified for military service. Duane then joins the Army to fight in Korea.

Jacy suggests to Sonny that they elope to Oklahoma. They marry and on their way to a honeymoon on Lake Texoma they are stopped by an Oklahoma state trooper. Jacy had left a note telling her parents about their plan, secretly hoping they would stop her. The Farrows have them held in custody until they arrive, her father dismissing Sonny completely and taking Jacy home. Sonny rides back with Jacy's mother, Lois, who reveals she was Sam's youthful lover and chides Sonny that he was much better off with Ruth than with Jacy. The marriage is promptly annulled.

Duane returns to town on leave from the Army before shipping out for Korea. Sonny shows up at his home, and the two make amends. They go to the picture show for its final screening (the Western Red River, set in Texas and starring John Wayne). The next morning, Sonny sees Duane off on the bus. Billy is sweeping the street and is hit and killed by a truck, to the complete indifference of some of the local townsmen who blame him for being stupid and careless. Sonny is devastated and berates the men for their behavior. He then seeks comfort from Ruth who has since become even more depressed and has shuttered herself in her house. She explodes in hurt and anger. Then, spent, she takes his outstretched hand, tentatively reuniting the pair.

Cast

Production
Going into The Last Picture Show Peter Bogdanovich was a 31-year-old stage actor, film essayist, and critic, with one small film to his directorial credit, Targets (also known as Before I Die). He had made the first with his wife and collaborator, Polly Platt. As Bogdanovich later explained to The Hollywood Reporter, while waiting in a cashier's line in a drugstore, he happened to look at the rack of paperbacks and his eye fell on an interesting title, The Last Picture Show. The back of the book said it was about "kids growing up in Texas" and Bogdanovich decided that it did not interest him and put it back. A few weeks later, actor Sal Mineo handed Platt a copy of the book. "I always wanted to be in this", he said, "but I'm a little too old now" and recommended that Platt and Bogdanovich make it into a film. According to Bogdanovich's recollection, Platt said, "I don't know how you make it into a picture, but it's a good book." Bogdanovich, McMurtry, and Platt adapted the novel into the film of the same name.

Stephen Friedman was a lawyer with Columbia Pictures but keen to break into film production as he had bought the film rights to the book, so Bogdanovich hired him as producer.

After discussing the proposed film with Orson Welles, his houseguest at the time, Bogdanovich agreed with him that shooting the film in black and white would work aesthetically, which by then was an unusual choice.

The film was shot in Larry McMurtry's small hometown of Archer City located in north-central Texas near the Oklahoma state line. The similarity to famed cowtown Abilene, Kansas, in Howard Hawks' Red River (1948) was intentional. Red River again is tied in as "the last picture show", which Sonny and Duane watch at the end of the film.

After shooting wrapped, Bogdanovich went back to Los Angeles to edit the film footage on a Moviola. Bogdanovich has said that he edited the entire film himself but refused to credit himself as editor, reasoning that director and co-writer were enough. When informed that the Motion Picture Editors Guild required an editor credit, he suggested Donn Cambern, who had been editing another film, Drive, He Said (1971), in the next office and had helped Bogdanovich with some purchasing paperwork concerning the film's opticals. Cambern disputes this, stating that Bogdanovich did do an edit of the film, which he screened for a selection of guests, including Jack Nicholson, Bob Rafelson and himself. The consensus was the film was going to be great, but needed further editing to achieve its full potential. Cambern claims Bogdanovich invited him to do so, during which he made significant contributions to the film's final form.

Bogdanovich obtained a rare waiver from the Directors Guild of America to have his name appear only at the end of the film, after the actors' credits, as he felt it was more meaningful for the audience to see their names after their performances.

Music
The film features entirely diegetic music, including many songs of Hank Williams Sr. and other country & western and 1950s popular music recording artists.

Reception and legacy

Box office
The film earned $13.1 million in domestic rentals in North America.

Critical reception
Chicago Sun-Times critic Roger Ebert gave the film four out of four stars in his original review and named it the best film of 1971. He later added it to his "Great Movies" list, writing that "the film is above all an evocation of mood. It is about a town with no reason to exist, and people with no reason to live there. The only hope is in transgression." Vincent Canby of The New York Times called it a "lovely film" that "rediscovers a time, a place, a film form—and a small but important part of the American experience." Gene Siskel of the Chicago Tribune gave the film four stars out of four and wrote, "Like few films in recent years, Peter Bogdanovich's The Last Picture Show ends with us wanting to see more of the people who occupy the small town world that is Anarene, Tex. in 1951. This emotion is not easily achieved. It is a result of a  Peyton Place investigation into Anarene's bedrooms, parked cars, football games, movie theater, restaurant, and pool hall." Charles Champlin of the Los Angeles Times called the film "the most considered, craftsmanlike and elaborate tribute we have yet had to what the movies were and how they figured in our lives." Gary Arnold of The Washington Post called it "an exceedingly well-made and involving narrative film with decent aims, encouraging us to understand and care about its characters, though not to emulate them."

, review aggregation website Rotten Tomatoes displays an approval rating of 100% based on 60 reviews, with an average rating of 9/10. The site's critics consensus reads: "Making excellent use of its period and setting, Peter Bogdanovich's small town coming-of-age story is a sad but moving classic filled with impressive performances." According to Metacritic, which assigned a weighted average score of 93 out of 100 based on 15 critics, the film received "universal acclaim".

Awards and nominations

It ranked No. 19 on [[Entertainment Weekly|Entertainment Weekly'''s]] list of the 50 Best High School Movies. In 2007, the film was ranked No. 95 on the American Film Institute's 10th Anniversary Edition of the 100 greatest American films of all time.

In April 2011, The Last Picture Show was re-released in UK and Irish cinemas, distributed by Park Circus. Total Film magazine gave the film a five-star review, stating: "Peter Bogdanovich's desolate Texan drama is still as stunning now as it was in 1971."

Home media
The film was released by The Criterion Collection in November 2010 as part of its box set America Lost and Found: The BBS Story. It included a high-definition digital transfer of Peter Bogdanovich's director's cut, two audio commentaries, one from 1991, featuring Bogdanovich and actors Cybill Shepherd, Randy Quaid, Cloris Leachman, and Frank Marshall; the other from 2009, featuring Bogdanovich "The Last Picture Show": A Look Back, (1999) and Picture This (1990), documentaries about the making of the film, A Discussion with Filmmaker Peter Bogdanovich, a 2009 Q&A, screen tests and location footage, and excerpts from a 1972 television interview with director François Truffaut about the New Hollywood.

Director's cut
Bogdanovich re-edited the film in 1992 to create a "director's cut". This version restores seven minutes of footage that Bogdanovich trimmed from the 1971 release because Columbia had imposed a firm 119-minute limit. With this requirement removed in the 1990s, Bogdanovich used the 127-minute cut on laserdisc, VHS and DVD releases. The original 1971 cut was never released on DVD or blu-ray for years, though it was released on VHS and laserdisc through Columbia Tristar Home Video. The 4K UHD release however, has the theatrical cut along with the more known director's cut. It's included as a part of Sony's Columbia Classics 4K Volume 3 set. 

There are two substantial scenes restored in the director's cut. The first is a sex scene between Jacy and Abilene that plays in the poolhall after it has closed for the night; it precedes the exterior scene where he drops her off home and she says "What a night. I never thought this would happen." The other major insertion is a scene that plays in Sam's café, where Genevieve watches while an amiable Sonny and a revved-up Duane decide to take their road trip to Mexico; it precedes the exterior scene outside the pool hall when they tell Sam of their plans, the last time they will ever see him.

Several shorter scenes were also restored. One comes between basketball practice in the gym and the exterior at The Rig-Wam drive-in; it has Jacy, Duane and Sonny riding along in her convertible (and being chased by an enthusiastic little dog), singing an uptempo rendition of the more solemn school song sung later at the football game. Another finds Sonny cruising the town streets in the pick-up, gazing longingly into Sam's poolhall, café and theater, from which he has been banished. Finally, there is an exterior scene of the auto caravan on its way to the Senior Picnic; as it passes the fishing tank where he had fished with Sam and Billy, Sonny sheds a tear for his departed friend and his lost youth.

Two scenes got slightly longer treatments: Ruth's and Sonny's return from the doctor, and the boys' returning Billy to Sam after his encounter with Jemmie Sue—both had added dialogue. Also, a number of individual shots were put back in, most notably a Gregg Toland-style deep focus shot in front of the Royal Theatre as everyone gets in their cars.

SequelTexasville, the 1990 sequel to The Last Picture Show'', based on McMurtry's 1987 novel of the same name, was also directed by Bogdanovich, from his own screenplay, without McMurtry this time. The film reunites actors Jeff Bridges, Cybill Shepherd, Timothy Bottoms, Cloris Leachman, Eileen Brennan, Randy Quaid, Sharon Ullrick (née Taggart) and Barc Doyle.

See also
 List of films with a 100% rating on Rotten Tomatoes, a film review aggregator website

Notes

References

External links

 
 
 
 
 
 
 The Last Picture Show: In With the Old an essay by Graham Fuller at the Criterion Collection
 The Last Picture Show essay by Daniel Eagan in America's Film Legacy: The Authoritative Guide to the Landmark Movies in the National Film Registry, Bloomsbury Academic, 2010 , pages 672–4.
 The Last Picture Show Original trailer on Texas Archive of the Moving Image

1970s coming-of-age drama films
1971 drama films
1971 films
American basketball films
American black-and-white films
American coming-of-age drama films
Censored films
Columbia Pictures films
1970s English-language films
Films based on American novels
Films directed by Peter Bogdanovich
Films featuring a Best Supporting Actor Academy Award-winning performance
Films featuring a Best Supporting Actor Golden Globe winning performance
Films featuring a Best Supporting Actress Academy Award-winning performance
Films set in 1951
Films set in 1952
Films set in Texas
Films shot in Texas
Films whose writer won the Best Screenplay BAFTA Award
Obscenity controversies in film
Films with screenplays by Larry McMurtry
Films with screenplays by Peter Bogdanovich
United States National Film Registry films
1970s American films